Lucas Marques da Silva, commonly known simply as Lucas (born 2 May 1990) is a Brazilian football midfielder who last played for Smederevo.

Born in São Paulo, he played in the youth categories of Santos FC and later, already as senior, he played for Brazilian sides Bragantino and Jabaquara and with Mexican Cruz Azul before coming to Serbia.

References

1990 births
Living people
Footballers from São Paulo
Brazilian footballers
Brazilian expatriate footballers
Association football midfielders
Clube Atlético Bragantino players
Jabaquara Atlético Clube players
Cruz Azul footballers
Expatriate footballers in Mexico
FK Smederevo players
Serbian SuperLiga players
Expatriate footballers in Serbia